Meike Holländer (born 18 January 1965) is a German rower. She competed in the women's eight event at the 1988 Summer Olympics for West Germany.

References

External links
 

1965 births
Living people
West German female rowers
Olympic rowers of West Germany
Rowers at the 1988 Summer Olympics
Sportspeople from Bremerhaven